The Type 08  is a family of eight-wheeled amphibious, modular armored vehicle developed by Norinco for infantry fire support, battlefield logistics and quick reaction operations. It is a recent People's Republic of China produced Infantry fighting vehicle for People's Liberation Army Ground Force and People's Liberation Army Marine Corps.

ZBL-08 is the designation for Infantry Fighting variant in the Type 08 vehicle family. The modular design claims to be able to field variety of different models including an APC model, assault gun, an Engineering model, a 122 mm self propelled howitzer model, a 155 mm self propelled howitzer model, an air defense model, a self-propelled mortar model, a reconnaissance model, a command vehicle model and much more.

Development
Development of Type 08 vehicle family starts in 1990s, as the successor to other aging Chinese wheeled vehicles. Type 08 was first seen in 2006 undergoing road tests.

Design

Overview 
The Type 08 has modular design that allows customization of the vehicle based on mission. The vehicle consists of six modules: engine module, transmission module, control module, suspension module, hull module, and weapon station module. The vehicle is fitted with digital battlefield management system, satellite navigation system, NBC protection, and automatic fire suppression system. It is able to datalink and communicate with other vehicles as well as the command posts.

Protection 
The vehicle is fitted with smoke dischargers and laser warning receivers to improve survivability. The vehicle is capable of all weather operation. The driver is equipped with a helmet-mounted night vision system fed from the CCD-based sensors fitted on the vehicle chassis.

Armaments 
ZBL-08 infantry fighting vehicle, the standard variant of Type 08 family, is equipped with ZPT-99 30 mm autocannon and Type 86 7.62 mm coaxial machine gun. Two HJ-73C ATGM rail launcher are mounted on both sides of the turret. The gunner is equipped with computerized fire control system, gun stabilization with automatic tracking, laser rangefinder, and thermal imagining device.

ZTL-11 assault vehicle is fitted with ZPL-98A 105 mm rifled gun with capability of launching armor piercing fin stabilized discarding sabot (APFSDS), high explosive (HE), and high-explosive anti-tank (HEAT) ammunitions, as well as the indigenous GP105 105 mm gun-fired laser beam riding guided anti-tank missile (ATGM). Secondary weapons include QJT-88 5.8 mm coaxial machine gun and QJC-88 12.7 mm roof-mounted heavy machine gun. The turret of ZTL-11 is derived from the Type 05 amphibious tank, but with more smoke dischargers. The assault vehicle is also fitted with ST-16 millimeter wave radar suite, similar to the one mounted on Type 99A tank. The radar is designed for target identification (IFF), acquisition and track.

Mobility
Type 08 family is powered by the Deutz BF6M1015C water-cooled V-type 6-cylinder diesel engine, developing 440 hp. The vehicle is equipped with automated manual transmission. The front four wheels are capable of power steering. The maximum speed is 100 km/h with 800 km of range on highway. The vehicle is fully amphibious with hydraulically controlled water jets mounted to the rear. The vehicle is fitted with computer-controlled central tire inflation system and steel-reinforced radial tire to improve mobility under off-road and emergency situation.

Variants

ZBL-08 (Type 08) Infantry Fighting Vehicle Original IFV variant with a ZPT-99 30 mm turret based on Shipunov 2A72. It features a crew cabin in the back for infantry transportation. HJ-73C missiles can be optionally mounted on the each side of the turret.
ZSL-10 (Type 10) Armoured Personal Carrier Based on IFV variant but the modified crew cabin has a higher ceiling. The Armored Personnel Carrier can be armed either with a manually controlled, armour-plate protected 12.7 machine gun or a remote-controlled weapon station. The APC is equipped with ten specialized shock absorbing seats for additional comfort and protection against land mines and improvised explosive device (IED).
Type 08 Armored Reconnaissance Vehicle Armed with a 30 mm turret, the vehicle has a chassis that is similar to the IFV variant. The Armored Reconnaissance Vehicle will advance before IFVs and assault guns for intelligence gathering. On-board high definition electro-optical cameras, thermal imaging system and laser designator can transmit battlefield and target information for other data-linked vehicles for target identification and designation. The Armored Reconnaissance Vehicle can provide better situational awareness for the infantry. The main radar and electro-optical sight is mounted on a retractable mast and is capable of data-link and image-sharing with other vehicles. Aerial reconnaissance capabilities are provided with various unmanned aerial vehicles. All reconnaissance vehicles are equipped with a launch rail behind the turret, capable of launching ASN-15 with  range and one hour endurance. BZK UAV can also be stored and assembled on the spot if longer range aerial reconnaissance is needed. In addition, individual scouts are equipped with hand-launched remote-controlled SUAV similar to RQ-11 Raven.
Type 08 Artillery Reconnaissance Vehicle The vehicle chassis is based on the APC variant and armed with 12.7 mm machine gun and HJ-73C anti-tank missile. The artillery reconnaissance vehicles does not perform combat reconnaissance missions, instead focusing on target acquisition for artillery battalions, collection of terrain and meteorological data through various observation instruments.
Type 08 Electro-Optical Reconnaissance Vehicle The vehicle chassis is based on the APC variant but with no turret and self-defense weapons. The prominent addition, comparing to other reconnaissance variants, is a rapid-spinning electro-optical surveillance camera that creates 360 degree panoramic video stream. The onboard sensor may include daylight camera, infrared-thermal camera, and night vision camera. 
PLL-09 (Type 09) Modular Self-propelled Howitzer system Based on IFV variant. Can be armed with either a 122 mm or 155 mm howitzer, to provide indirect fire support for infantry.

ZTL-11 (Type 11) Assault Gun Armed with a 105 mm rifled gun, coaxial machine gun and 12.7 mm anti-air machine gun, the Assault gun is based on the IFV chassis and can provide direct fire support for infantry battalions and engage enemy light vehicles and stationary targets such as bunkers. ZTL-11 shares a turret very similar to ZTD-05 amphibious assaults vehicle. The vehicle is alternately designated ZLT-11.
PGL-12 (Type 12) Anti-Air Gun-Missile System Armed with a single-barrel 35 mm revolver autocannon, derived from the 35 mm anti-aircraft gun system on PGZ-09. Additional air coverage is provided by two FN-6 MANPADS mounted on the top-right side of the turret. The electronics include thermal-tracking sight, targeting and surveillance radars. The data collected by the radars can be data-linked back to command and armored reconnaissance vehicle. Although the system shares the armaments with PGZ-09, the loading mechanism is completely different. Since PGL-12 only has one barrel (whereas PGZ-09 has two), the new gun system requires a higher fire rate for sufficient firepower density. The redesigned unmanned turret with proprietary revolving loading system can provide 1000 rounds/minute rate of fire, increased from the 550 rounds/minute per barrel on the PGZ-09.
PGL-XX (Code name 625) Air Defense Gun-Missile System Unnamed prototype vehicle featuring a 6-barrel 25 mm gatling gun for short range air defense. code-named "625", PGL-XX was revealed under testing in 2021. It uses 25x287 mm ammunition technology with upgraded radar, computer system and data-link. The 625 anti-air system will be paired with HQ-17A wheeled short-range air-defense system. The gatling gun system was deemed by PLA to be better at counter rocket, artillery, and mortar missions. The vehicle is spotted in a military training mission at Tibet Military District. 
Type 08 Command Vehicle With a modified chassis that has a much higher ceiling than the APC variant, the crew cabin provides a more spacious environment for commanders and staff. Equipped with satellite communication suite and battle management system, the command vehicle can move with the mechanized infantry for better battlefield management.
Type 08 Communication Vehicle Based on the Command Vehicle variant. It has additional communication equipment on board for the infantry battalion.
Type 08 Armored Ambulance Based on the Command Vehicle variant. Featuring a modified crew cabin with medical equipment, the Armored Ambulance variant has two Red Cross markers on each side of the vehicle body.
Type 14 Hazardous Environment Reconnaissance Vehicle Based on the Command Vehicle variant. Equipped with sensors and equipment for hazardous detection involving nuclear, biological and chemical environment.
Type 08 Electronic Warfare Vehicle Based on the Command Vehicle variant but the satellite communication suite on top of the vehicle roof is replaced by a rectangular shaped radar with several small radar panels for Electronic Support Measures.
Type 08 Assault Breach Vehicle Based on the IFV variant. It is equipped with mine plow, mine detection device, and rocket-projected mine clearing line charge (MICLIC).
Type 08 Mobile Bridge Builder Based on the IFV variant. It is equipped with a vehicle-launched bridge on top of the hull.
Type 08 Armored Recovery Vehicle Based on the IFV variant, the turret is replaced by a crane for emergency vehicle service.
Type 08 Armored Cargo Vehicle Based on the APC variant, the Armored Cargo Vehicle has more bullet-proof windows on the vehicle body.
Type 08 Engineering Vehicle The vehicle has a unique chassis. It is equipped with tools for road paving and obstacle neutralization. A bulldozer blade is fitted on the front of the vehicle and an excavator bucket is mounted on the front-end of the roof. Waterline marks can also be found on the side of the vehicle body.:

Export Variant 
VS27 Armored rescue vehicle
VE36 Reconnaissance vehicle
VE32A Reconnaissance vehicle
CS/SA5 Specialized air defense variant with a 6-barrel Gatling gun. The chassis of CS/SA5 is based on a modified Type 08 IFV. It comes with an air surveillance radar on the rear of the turret roof with a 2-axis adaptive-follow tracking radar situated on the starboard side of the surveillance radar while the thermal-tracking sight situated on the port side can provide visual information of target through fire control computers.
CS/AA5 Specialized IFV variants with a remote-controlled 40mm turret. The chassis of CS/AA5 is based on Type 08 IFV.
VN-1 Export variant based on Type 08 IFV. The VN-1C is armed with a 30 mm remote weapons station and a HJ-73 anti-tank missile.
SWS-2 Export SHORAD gun/missile system variant of the VN-1. It is armed with a 35 mm cannon and four surface-to-air missiles. This vehicle is the export version of the PGL-12 anti-air artillery system.
ST-1 Export variant based on Type 11 Assault gun, armed with a L7 105mm rifled gun. The turret is also used on the WMA301 and ST-2.
ST-3 Hybrid artillery tank destroyer, armed with a high elevation 105mm gun.
SH-11 Export-oriented 155 mm self-propelled howitzer armed with a 39-caliber gun, which can be replaced with a 52-caliber gun without changing the chassis. It features a fully automatic loading system and the latest generation of optics.
AFT-10 ATGM carrier First shown at the 2018 Zhuhai Airshow.
JRVG-1A Anti-Air Gun System First shown at the 2018 Zhuhai Airshow. The JRVG-1A uses a stretched 10x10 Type 08 chassis. The picture shown in the catalogue differs from the presented vehicle, the lower rear section of the hull is wider, that’s where the waterjets are mounted on the 8x8 versions, which the presented vehicle misses. A tracked variant called JRVG-1B was listed in the catalogue too. The vehicle is armed with a naval 76mm turret, which includes a detection and fire control radar like the Italian Otomatic SPAAG. A water cooling system allows a fire rate up to 300rpm.

Operators

 People's Liberation Army Ground Force - 4,950+ units as of 2021. 2,500 units of ZBL-08; 1,000 units of ZTL-11; 900 units of ZSL-10; 550 units of PLL-09; Uncounted units of other variants.
 People's Liberation Army Marine Corps - 200+ units as of 2021. 150 units of ZBL-08; 50 units of ZTL-11; Uncounted units of other variants.

 Gabonese Army: On display at the 2019 Independence Day parade.

 Nigerian Army: ST1

 The Royal Thai Army (RTA) signed a contract to purchase 38 VN-1 IFVs for first batch. The vehicles will be delivered by 2019 at the price of US$1.695 million each. Thailand ordered 37 more vehicles for second batch. The VN-1 was put into service in February 2021 with the 2nd Cavalry Regiment.

 Bolivarian Marine Infantry

Potential operators
 The Argentine Army shows interested in buying the Type 08.

Failed Bids 
 The Chinese government offered the ST-1 to the Brazilian Army in April 2021, under the Army's "VBC Cav" program to obtain 221 units of an 8 x 8 assault gun, for the replacement of the EE-9 Cascavel in operation since 1974.

Gallery

See also 
Related development
 ZBD-03 - airborne combat vehicle developed by China
 ZBD-04 - tracked infantry fighting vehicle developed by China
 ZBD-05 - amphibious fighting vehicle developed by China
 Type 07P - infantry fighting vehicle developed by China for export sales
Comparable ground systems 
 Stryker/M1128 MGS/M1134
 LAV III
 Amphibious Combat Vehicle
 K808 Armored Personnel Carrier
 Boxer
 VBCI
 Freccia IFV
 VPK-7829 Bumerang
 CM-32
 Type 96 Armored Personnel Carrier/Type 16 maneuver combat vehicle
 Patria AMV

References

Wheeled amphibious armoured fighting vehicles
Armoured fighting vehicles of the People's Republic of China
Eight-wheeled vehicles
Military vehicles introduced in the 2000s
Wheeled infantry fighting vehicles
Infantry fighting vehicles of the post–Cold War period